Drankin' Patnaz is the second studio album by American Southern hip hop duo YoungBloodZ from Atlanta, Georgia. It was released on August 26, 2003 via So So Def/Arista Records. The album features guest appearances from Jazze Pha, Backbone, Killer Mike and Lil' Jon. It peaked at number 5 on the Billboard 200 and at number 1 on the Top R&B/Hip-Hop Albums chart in the United States, and was certified gold by the Recording Industry Association of America on November 7, 2003. The album sold 85,036 copies in its first week.

Track listing

Charts

Weekly charts

Year-end charts

Certifications

References

External links

2003 albums
YoungBloodZ albums
Arista Records albums
So So Def Recordings albums
Albums produced by Lil Jon
Albums produced by Jazze Pha